Aqkand (also Romanized as Āqkand, Āq Kand, Āgh Kand, and Ak-Kend) is a city in Kaghazkonan District of Mianeh County, East Azerbaijan province, Iran. At the 2006 census, its population was 1,823 in 477 households. The following census in 2011 counted 1,733 people in 544 households. The latest census in 2016 showed a population of 2,902 people in 913 households.

References 

Meyaneh County

Cities in East Azerbaijan Province

Populated places in East Azerbaijan Province

Populated places in Meyaneh County